The YuYuPas Tsou Cultural Tribe Park is a tourist attraction located at about 1,200 meters above sea level in the mountainous  Alishan area of  Chiayi County, Taiwan Province. Originating from the Tsou language, YuYuPas means "very rich." It covers an area of roughly two hectares and is surrounded by extensive tea gardens planted with alpine oolong tea.

The park was established in 2010 to showcase Tsou culture and help stem out-migration and provide some economic stability following Typhoon Morakot in 2009.

References

External links

YUYUPAS official website
Tribal Tourism Brings Alishan Girls Home
Introduction of Tsou Tribe

Buildings and structures in Chiayi County
Taiwanese aboriginal culture and history
Tourist attractions in Chiayi County